Edi Paloka (born 23 December 1965) is an Albanian Democratic Party politician and former Member of Parliament (MP) for Durrës. He was first elected MP in the 2001 general election and then for three other legislatures successively as a member of the parliamentary group of the Democratic Party.

References

External links 
Democratic Party of Albania Official Website
Parliament of Albania Official Website

Living people
Democratic Party of Albania politicians
Members of the Parliament of Albania
21st-century Albanian politicians
1965 births